Donja Brezna is a village in the municipality of Plužine, Montenegro.

Demographics
According to the 2011 census, its population was 140.

References

Populated places in Plužine Municipality